The  Florence Lake National Wildlife Refuge, in Burleigh County, North Dakota, United States, has almost  of virgin native mixed-grass prairie and a  lake. This high quality prairie habitat attracts grassland birds including grassland passerines that are sought by birders visiting the region. Florence Lake National Wildlife Refuge is administered by Long Lake National Wildlife Refuge as an unstaffed satellite refuge.

References
Refuge website

National Wildlife Refuges in North Dakota
Protected areas of Burleigh County, North Dakota